Carlos Gómez (born 1985) is a Major League Baseball outfielder.

Carlos Gómez may also refer to:
 Carlos Gómez (actor) (born 1962), American actor
 Carlos Gómez (footballer, born 1952) (1952–2017), Mexican football defender
 Carlos Gómez (footballer, born 1992), Chilean footballer
 Carlos Gómez (footballer, born 1994), Spanish footballer
 Carlos Clos Gómez (born 1972), football referee
 Carlos Enríquez Gómez (1900–1957), Cuban painter, illustrator and writer
 Carlos Argüello Gómez (born 1947), Nicaraguan lawyer and diplomat
 Carlos Gómez Álava (1926–1988), Filipino poet
 Carlos Gómez Barrera (1918–1996), Mexican musician
 Carlos Gómez-Herrera (born 1990), Spanish tennis player